Santa Clara Volcano is a volcanic field and lava flow in the Diamond Valley in Washington County, Utah, United States. The most prominent features are two cinder cones that rise above Snow Canyon State Park.  The southern cinder cone and most of the north cinder cone is within the boundaries of Snow Canyon State Park.  The city of St. George, Utah is located in a volcanic field. The date of the last eruption is unknown.

References

External links

Volcanoes of Utah
Mountains of Utah
Volcanic fields of Utah
Mountains of Washington County, Utah
Pleistocene volcanoes
Holocene volcanoes
Inactive volcanoes
Quaternary United States
Cinder cones of the United States